The Jeyes Professional and Amateur Tournament was an Irish golf tournament played from 1962 to 1966. The event featured a number of amateurs who competed for separate prizes. The event was sponsored by Jeyes Group.

The inaugural event in 1962 featured separate sections for professionals and amateurs who competed for separate prizes. After the first 36 holes, the leading 22 players in each section competed on the final day. An Irish amateur, David Sheahan finished on 282, winning the amateur section by 8 strokes, and ahead of all the professionals, led by Denis Hutchinson on 283.

Winners

References

Golf tournaments in Ireland
Recurring sporting events established in 1962
Recurring events disestablished in 1966